Strand Beach Elevator is an inclined elevator in Dana Point, California that transports people between a beach area and a hilltop, making the beach accessible.  A developer agreed to construct this amenity for the city as part of an overall deal for a large real estate development.  It was completed and opened in 2009, and ownership and operation was turned over to the city.

See also 
 Angels Flight, funicular in downtown Los Angeles
 List of funicular railways

References

External links 
 City of Dana Point Description

2009 establishments in California
Funicular railways in the United States